Events from the year 1741 in Canada.

Incumbents
French Monarch: Louis XV
British and Irish Monarch: George II

Governors
Governor General of New France: Charles de la Boische, Marquis de Beauharnois
Colonial Governor of Louisiana: Jean-Baptiste Le Moyne de Bienville
Governor of Nova Scotia: Paul Mascarene
Commodore-Governor of Newfoundland: Henry Medley

Events
 First Fort Dauphin, was built near Winnipegosis, Manitoba.
 Vitus Bering, in service of Russia, reaches Alaska; Russians soon trade with natives for sea otter pelts.
 Alexei Chirikof, with Bering expedition, sights land on July 15; the Europeans had found Alaska.
 Russians Vitus Bering and Aleksi Cherikov 'discover' Alaska and bring back fur skins (Bering shipwrecked on return and died); the Fur Rush is on.
 The lives of early Alaskans remained basically unchanged for thousands of years, until Russian sailors, led by Danish explorer Vitus Bering, sighted Alaska's mainland in 1741.
 The Russians were soon followed by British, Spanish, and American adventurers. But it was the Russians who stayed to trade for the pelts of sea otters and other fur-bearing animals, interjecting their own culture and staking a strong claim on Alaska. Once the fur trade declined, however, the Russians lost interest in this beautiful though largely unexplored land.
 Fort Bourbon established near present-day Grand Rapids, Manitoba.
 François-Josué de la Corne Dubreuil appointed commandant at Fort Kaministiquia.

Births
6 June - Denis Viger, businessman and politician
19 September - Jacob Jordan, businessman and politician
3 November - Joshua Upham, lawyer, judge and politician
6 November - Joseph-Laurent Bertrand, priest

Deaths

Historical documents
Sloop "Sarah" (Abraham Brasher, captain) lands in Newfoundland with enslaved people purchased in New York

Wanting new trade and discoveries, Hudson's Bay Company countermands Chief Factor Richard Norton's order to stop search for Northwest Passage

Captain seeking Northwest Passage ordered to "cultivate a Friendship and Alliance" with Indigenous people living by "Western American Ocean"

Hudson's Bay Company states objections to Capt. Middleton visiting their forts while searching for Northwest Passage

After much fruitless proselytizing, Jesuit missionary converts everyone at "Mission of l'Assomption among the Hurons" (Note: "savages" used)

Haudenosaunee who bring enslaved Chickasaw to Kahnawake no longer burn them, but adopt and convert them (Note: "savages" used)

Board of Trade warned that Acadians smuggle commodities (sometimes "whole droves of Cattle") to Île-Royale via many east coast harbours

Nova Scotia Council "follow the Antient laws & Customs" of Acadians, except where royal rights or British laws are involved

Council president Paul Mascarene says priests cannot govern "the Temporall by the Spirituall, Incroaching [and] Endeavouring" to rule parishes

Among many warnings, Mascarene says if Acadians devalue British leniency, "we shall find a way to make them repent [slighting] so good an offer"

Council secretary's widow needs his debtors to pay up so she can buy merchandise in Boston to sell and pay his debts

New York lieutenant governor calls for funding of new chapel for Kanien’kéhà:ka, as requested by their sachems

Deed by which Seneca sachems sell large tract of land in Albany County, New York to Crown

Example of music (notes and lyrics) of Indigenous people in Nova Scotia

References 

 
41